Rineloricaria phoxocephala is a species of catfish in the family Loricariidae. It is native to South America, where it occurs in the Amazon River basin in Brazil. The species reaches 15 cm (5.9 inches) in standard length and is believed to be a facultative air-breather.

References 

Loricariidae
Fish described in 1889
Catfish of South America
Freshwater fish of Brazil
Fish of the Amazon basin